Aloke Bhattacharjee (24 August 1953 – 24 December 2016) was an Indian cricketer and umpire. He stood in three One Day International (ODI) matches between 1998 and 2002.

He played first-class cricket as a spin bowler for Bengal from 1971 to 1987, and represented East Zone several times. He took his best bowling figures of 7 for 7 in the second innings against Assam in 1974–75, for match figures of 12.2–6–11–10.

See also
 List of One Day International cricket umpires

References

External links

1953 births
2016 deaths
Indian One Day International cricket umpires
People from Howrah
Indian cricketers
Bengal cricketers
East Zone cricketers